The Crown Court is the court of first instance of England and Wales responsible for hearing all indictable offences, some either way offences and appeals lied to it by the magistrates' courts. It is one of three Senior Courts of England and Wales.

The Crown Court sits in around 92 locations in England and Wales. The administration of the Crown Court is conducted by the Courts and Tribunals Service (HMCTS).  Previously conducted across six circuits (Midland, Northern, North Eastern, South Eastern, Wales & Chester and Western), HMCTS is now divided into seven regions; Midlands, North East, North West, South East, South West, London, and Wales. The Wales region was identified separately, having regard to the devolved legislative powers of the Welsh Government. When the Crown Court sits in the City of London it is known as the Central Criminal Court or "Old Bailey"; this Court locus was established by its own Act of Parliament and serves as the predominant venue for the most serious criminal cases.

The Crown Court carries out four principal types of activity: appeals from decisions of magistrates; sentencing of defendants committed from magistrates’ courts, jury trials, and the sentencing of those who are convicted in the Crown Court, either after trial or on pleading guilty. The average time from receipt by the Crown Court to completion was 177 days by the start of 2016.

Appeals from magistrates' courts

In 2015 the Crown Court heard 11,348 appeals against conviction, sentence or both, from those convicted in the magistrates' courts. At the conclusion of the hearing the Crown Court has the power to confirm, reverse or vary any part of the decision under appeal. If the appeal is decided against the accused, the Crown Court has the power to impose any sentence which the magistrates could have imposed, including one which is harsher than the one originally imposed. The average waiting time for appeals was 8.8 weeks in 2015.

Defendants committed from magistrates' for sentencing
In 2015, the Crown Court dealt with 30,802 cases for sentencing from the magistrates' courts. As the magistrates' courts only have the power to impose up to a twelve-month custodial sentence, the court has the power to commit defendants to the Crown Court for sentencing — this can be done when they are of the opinion that either the offence, or the combination of the offence and one or more offences associated with it, was so serious that greater punishment should be inflicted than the magistrates' court has power to impose, or, in the case of a violent or sexual offence, that a custodial sentence longer than the court has power to impose is necessary to protect the public from serious harm. Committals may also arise from breaches of the terms of a Community Rehabilitation Order or a suspended sentence of imprisonment. The court performance target is that cases committed for sentence should be heard within 10 weeks.

Appeals from the Crown Court

When the Crown Court is dealing with a matter connected with a trial on indictment (i.e., a jury trial), appeal lies to the criminal division of the Court of Appeal and thence to the Supreme Court. In all other cases, appeal from the Crown Court lies by way of case stated to a Divisional Court of the High Court.

Judges
The judges who normally sit in the Crown Court are High Court judges, circuit judges and recorders. Circuit judges also sit in the County Court. Recorders are barristers or solicitors in private practice, who sit part-time as judges. The most serious cases (treason, murder, rape etc.) are allocated to High Court judges and senior circuit judges. Appeals against conviction or sentence arising from the Magistrates’ Courts are normally heard by a Circuit Judge or a Recorder sitting with one or two experienced magistrates. The remainder of cases are dealt with by Circuit judges and Recorders, although Recorders will normally handle less serious work than circuit judges. The allocation is conducted according to directions given by the Lord Chief Justice of England and Wales.

History
The Criminal Justice Administration Act 1956 set up two additional courts of assize and quarter sessions, the Crown Court at Liverpool and the Crown Court at Manchester, to improve the handling of criminal cases in South Lancashire.  A royal commission (Cmnd 4135), headed by Lord Beeching, was established to review the English criminal justice system, and recommended the replacement of the assizes and quarter sessions with a new system of courts, following the examples of Liverpool and Manchester.

The Crown Court was established on 1 January 1972 by the Courts Act 1971, acting on the recommendations of the commission. The Crown Court is a permanent unitary court across England and Wales, whereas the assizes were periodic local courts heard before judges of the Queen's Bench Division of the High Court, who travelled across the seven circuits into which England and Wales were divided, assembling juries in the assize towns and hearing cases. The quarter sessions were local courts assembled four times a year to dispose of criminal cases which were not serious enough to go before a High Court judge.

The Crown Court and the County Court may sit in the same building and use the same judges. Since the establishment of Her Majesty's Courts Service in April 2005, there is an increased sharing of facilities between the Crown Court, County Court and magistrates' courts.

Physical layout

At the front of the court, on a raised platform, is a large bench. This is where the judge sits. His/her rank can be distinguished by the colour of gown worn, and different forms of address are appropriate for different ranks of judge, with "Your Honour" used for circuit judges and recorders at most locations, and "My Lord" or "My Lady" being used for High Court judges, as well as for all judges at the Central Criminal Court. The judge enters and exits the court from a door typically at the side of the platform, preceded by a cry of "All Rise" from the usher or clerk of the court who sits below and in front of the judge's bench. Everyone present is required to show their subjection to the court by standing as the judge enters (or exits) the courtroom until the judge sits down.

There is no Union Flag in a Crown Court courtroom, nor does the judge have a gavel. There is however a Royal Coat of Arms on the wall above the judge's bench.

The clerk of the court, who sits facing the court (that is, the same way as the judge), has a dedicated desk with computer and telephone, used when communication is necessary with other parts of the court building (for example the jury assembly area or the cell complex).

Also in the area just in front of the judge's bench is a stenographer who records proceedings on a stenograph, by typing keys as the witnesses speak, using special shorthand. Alternatively, if there is no stenographer, a tapelogger or shorthand writer will be there to operate the tapes and ensure that a log of the proceedings is kept.

Another member of court staff is the usher. If papers or other objects need to be passed around the court, for example notes from members of the jury, or evidence being shown to the jury, normally the usher will do this and will be the only person in the court to walk around while the court is in session.

Behind the usher, wearing black gowns and white wigs and facing the judge, will be the prosecuting and defending barristers. The defending barrister will usually be nearer the jury. The barristers may well have laptop computers in addition to files of papers relating to the case which will be on the desk in front of them. Unlike the judge, who speaks sitting down, the barristers always stand to address the court.

Behind the barristers will sit the instructing solicitors, who in the case of the prosecution will usually be a representative of the Crown Prosecution Service.

At the back of the courtroom, behind the solicitors, is a semi-partitioned area known as the "dock". This is where the defendant or defendants are placed. A custody officer will be sitting with them in the dock.

Also at the back of the court, often adjacent to the dock, is an area from where members of the public can observe the proceedings. In some courts, notably the Old Bailey, this area is positioned above the defendant.

Members of the press may sit in the press bench, which is usually positioned alongside the prosecuting barrister. Etiquette usually requires reporters to identify themselves to the usher before taking position here and starting to write.

Alongside the defending barrister is the jury box. This is where the jury watch the case from. They will be called to it from the jury waiting area (benches next to it) to be sworn in. Once sworn they always sit in the same seat throughout the trial. If proceedings (such as legal argument about the admissibility of evidence) take place which they are not supposed to see occur, the usher will escort them into a room just outside the courtroom (probably behind the dock). Only jurors and ushers ever enter this room.

Opposite the jury box is the witness box. Witnesses stand facing the jury and give their evidence so the jury can watch their demeanor while giving it, which might help them decide if the witness is being truthful.

When the judge sends the jury to consider their verdict, the usher escorts them to a small suite consisting of a large table, 12 chairs, lavatory facilities, paper and pencils, a button with which to call the usher, and prominent notices about not revealing deliberations to anyone else. The usher withdraws, and when the jury have arrived at a verdict, they push the button.

During deliberations, only limited contact is permitted with the outside world, always via the usher. The jury will be permitted only (a) to call for refreshments, (b) to pass a note to the judge, perhaps asking for further guidance, or (c) to announce that they have reached a verdict. The judge may decide to recall them to the court to address them again at any time.

Circuits
Originally, the court was divided into six circuits as follows:

See also
List of courts in England and Wales
List of Crown Court venues in England and Wales
United States district court

References

External links
 CBBC Newsround Guide
 Directgov guide to the Crown Court

Courts of England and Wales
Senior Courts of England and Wales
1972 establishments in the United Kingdom
England and Wales